Telkom-2 was a geosynchronous communications satellite built by Orbital Sciences Corporation (OSC) for Indonesia's state-owned telecommunications company, PT Telekomunikasi Indonesia Tbk (PT Telkom). Telkom-2 was successfully launched on 16 November 2005, at 23:46:00 UTC and positioned in geostationary orbit, at 118° East for replaced Palapa-B4.

History 
Based on Orbital's highly successful and flight-proven STAR-2 satellite bus, Telkom-2 featured state-of-the-art communications satellite technology, and 24 C-band transponders. The new spacecraft replaced PT Telkom's on-orbit Palapa-B4 satellite, improved communications coverage across Indonesia, and allowed PT Telkom to expand its coverage area into southeast Asia and the Indian subcontinent. Orbital also supplemented Telkom's existing ground station, and offered extensive mission operations support. There were several postponements prior to Telkom-2's launch. Three launch delays happened in November 2005 due to technical problems with the Ariane 5 launch vehicle. Multiple delayed took place between November 2004 and October 2005 due to different problems including technical problems with the satellite. Orbital's contract with PT Telkom included an optional order for another geostationary satellite. Telkom-2 was finally launched on 16 November 2005.

Telkom-2 successfully operated for 15 years. The satellite was retired and placed into a graveyard orbit in June 2021.

Specification of Telkom-2 satellite:
 Owner: PT Telkomunikasi Indonesia Tbk (PT Telkom) 
 Mission: C-band communications for Indonesia 
 Performance: Repeater - two groups of 15-for-12 linearized traveling-wave tube assemblies (TWTA)
 Transponders Power - 39 watts RF
 Stabilization - three-axis, zero momentum
 Redundancy: Full dual string
 Solar arrays: 2 panel wings with improved triple-junction GaAs cells
 Propulsion: Liquid bi-propellant transfer orbit system; monopropellant (hydrazine) on-orbit
 Repeater: Two groups of 15-for-12 linear traveling wave tube assemblies (TWTAs)
 Antenna: Two 2.0 m (6.6 ft) dual-griddled shaped-beam reflectors

Also 
 Article Satelit Telkom-2 telah Diluncurkan, internet: https://web.archive.org/web/20070623104954/http://pribadi.or.id/diary/2005/11/17/satelit-telkom-2-telah-diluncurkan/

References

External links 
 Telkom-2
 Telkom-1
 Satellites in Space, (orbital.com)

Communications satellites
Communications in Indonesia
Satellites of Indonesia
Communications satellites in geostationary orbit
Spacecraft launched in 2005
Satellites using the GEOStar bus
2005 in Indonesia